FLHS may refer to one of the following high schools:

 Fair Lawn High School, Fair Lawn, New Jersey
 Fairfield Ludlowe High School, Fairfield, Connecticut
 Faith Lutheran High School, Crystal Lake, Illinois
 Faith Lutheran Middle School & High School, Las Vegas, Nevada
 Fort Lauderdale High School, Broward County, Florida
 Fort Lee High School, Fort Lee, New Jersey
 Forest Lake Area High School, Forest Lake, Minnesota
 Forest Lawn High School, Calgary, Alberta, Canada
 Fox Lane High School, Bedford, New York
 Francis Lewis High School, Fresh Meadows, New York City
 Fred Longworth High School, Tyldesley, Greater Manchester, England

See also